The Department of Publication under the Union Ministry of Urban Development at Government of India acquires, stocks and make available books on various subjects.

It became an independent department in 1973 and publishes all the government books. It provides information on publication programs, various agents and agencies along with information on publishing and distribution.

References 

Publishing in India